The Young Karl Marx is a 2017 historical drama film about Karl Marx, directed by Haitian filmmaker and political activist Raoul Peck, co-written by Peck and Pascal Bonitzer, and starring August Diehl. It had its world premiere at the 67th Berlin International Film Festival on 12 February 2017.

Plot
While in his 20s, Karl Marx struggles to establish himself as a writer of political and sociological importance. The film begins with a scene where poor people are gathering dead wood in a forest where they have done this for centuries, but the government has made it illegal to collect the wood as it is now legally private property of the landlords.  The poor are persecuted and extrajudicially killed by the government officials.  Marx wrote about these events and believes that the bourgeois class has taken ownership of the state itself.

Marx meets Friedrich Engels, a young man whose wealthy father owns factories. Engels' belief that the workers there and elsewhere, including children, are mistreated and underpaid matures. The men begin to work together to create a new political movement to reform and unite the impoverished workers. Eventually, the two stage a coup during a meeting of the League of the Just and create the Communist League in its place. The film ends with Marx and Engels publishing select theories, in a simple language for anyone to understand in a relatively short writing known as The Communist Manifesto the same year of the 1848 revolutions.

Cast
August Diehl as Karl Marx
Stefan Konarske as Friedrich Engels
Vicky Krieps as Jenny von Westphalen
Olivier Gourmet as Pierre Proudhon
Hannah Steele as Mary Burns
Alexander Scheer as Wilhelm Weitling
Hans-Uwe Bauer as Arnold Ruge
Michael Brandner as Joseph Moll
Ivan Franěk as Mikhail Bakunin
Peter Benedict as Friedrich Engels Sr.
Niels-Bruno Schmidt as Karl Grün
Marie Meinzenbach as Lenchen
Eric Godon as The foreman
Stephen Hogan as Thomas Naylor
Rolf Kanies as Moses Hess
Ulrich Brandhoff as Hermann Kriege
Aran Bertetto as Paddy

Reception

Critical reception
On review aggregator website Rotten Tomatoes, the film holds an approval rating of 63% based on 51 reviews, and an average rating of 6/10. The website's critical consensus reads, "The Young Karl Marx makes a valiant attempt to make the philosophical cinematic, but lacks sufficient depth to tackle its complex themes." On Metacritic, the film has a weighted average score of 62 out of 100, based on 14 critics, indicating "generally favorable reviews".

The Guardians review by Peter Bradshaw gave the film four out of five stars and stated, "It shouldn't work, but it does, due to the intelligence of the acting and the stamina and concentration of the writing and directing." In a review for Inside Higher Ed, Scott McLemee described the film as "a nuanced and surprisingly accurate portrait of the revolutionary as a young man", noting its faithfulness to the historical record. Writing for the New Statesman, Suzanne Moore described the film as "sparky, brave and totally absorbing" and "in many ways a conventional biopic, lifted by its performances, and by its insistence that ideas matter". A.O. Scott of the New York Times regarded it as being "both intellectually serious and engagingly free-spirited."

Awards and nominationsTraverse City Film Festival'''Founders Grand Prize: 2017

Home Video
The film has been released on Blu-ray and DVD in areas of Europe, though these releases are reported to lack English subtitles for extensive passages of dialogue in German or French, and are region-locked.  A Region 1 DVD has been released for the North American market which includes English subtitles.

See also
 Marx Reloaded''
 Karl Marx in film

References

External links
 

2017 films
2017 biographical drama films
2017 multilingual films
2010s English-language films
2010s French-language films
2010s German-language films
2010s historical drama films
Belgian biographical drama films
Belgian historical drama films
Belgian multilingual films
Biographical films about philosophers
Biographical films about revolutionaries
Cultural depictions of Karl Marx
English-language Belgian films
English-language French films
English-language German films
Films about communism
Films directed by Raoul Peck
Films set in the 19th century
Films shot in Brandenburg
Films shot in Brussels
France 3 Cinéma films
French biographical drama films
French historical drama films
French multilingual films
German biographical drama films
German historical drama films
German multilingual films
2010s French films
2010s German films